Daniel Rajna born 1968, is a South African ballet dancer. After gaining a BSc in applied mathematics at UCT, he trained at the UCT Ballet school, Cape Town. He joined the former CAPAB Ballet in 1990, before leaving in 1997 to join PACT Ballet in Pretoria. He returned to Cape Town in 1999 and was a principal dancer at the Cape Town City Ballet. He is known for his interpretation of dramatic ballets and his partnership with friend, Tracy Li. He and his wife Leanne Voysey, a former principal dancer with  Cape Town City Ballet, have a son Finn (born July 2007). He is the son of composer Thomas Rajna. He has performed as a guest artist in Hong Kong, Zimbabwe, The United States, South Africa and Taiwan. They were also both invited to the 2004 International Ballet Festival of Miami. He retired in August 2007 after several performances of Camille. After retirement Rajna made a radical career change and after studying for three years, joined a civil consultancy as a dam designer. He continued his association with ballet and was asked back on occasion to coach members of the ballet company. In 2015 Rajna and Li were invited to come out of retirement to give two performances of Veronica Paeper's ballet, "Carmen" accompanied by the Cape Town Philharmonic Orchestra.

Awards 
 FNB Vita Award 1999
 Balletomanes Award for best male dancer, 1996, 2000, 2002 and 2006
 Daphne Levy Award for his partnership with Tracy Li, 2001

Notable roles 
 Pluto in Orpheus in the Underworld
 Albrecht in Giselle
 Basilio in Don Quixote
 Crassus in Spartacus
 Armand in Camille
 Don Jose in Carmen
 Puck in A Midsummer Night's Dream
 James in La Sylphide
 Romeo in Romeo and Juliet
 Nutcracker Prince in The Nutcracker
 Florimund in The Sleeping Beauty
 Prince Siegfried in Swan Lake

References

External links
 Daniel Rajna at the Dance Directory
 Cape Town City Ballet Company
 Pas de Deux Couple Tracy Li & Daniel Rajna
 Dancers exit stage for new future
 Tracy Li and Daniel Rajna to reunite for Cape Town City Ballet
 Carmen gets retired dancers back on stage
 Final Pas de deux from the ballet "Camille"

1968 births
Living people
South African male ballet dancers
Alumni of Rondebosch Boys' High School
University of Cape Town alumni